Soleram or Suliram (also known as Soreram, or Suriram) is a folk song from Riau, Indonesia. It is also a well-known folk song in Malaysia. This song is melodious and sung in a gentle rhythm, with lyrics that are relatively short and easy to remember.

The Soleram song has many variations in its lyrics. The song, thought to be a lullaby of the Riau people, may contain messages that parents want to convey to their children at bedtime, such as words of endearment, being modest and holding on to old friends.

Background 
Soleram or Suliram is a traditional song of the Riau people. The song is found in other regions outside Riau, and Malaysia where it is a popular lullaby spelt Suriram also lays claim to the song. The verses may be in the form of a Malay pantun with an ABAB rhyming scheme, there are, however, variations in lyrics and rhymes in different versions.  

Soleram or Suliram is one of the Indonesian folk songs that caught the international interest, notably since The Weavers (an American folk music quartet) recorded the song in 1949. It was later adapted by singers such as Pete Seeger and Miriam Makeba in 1960. In Indonesia, the song has been recorded by music groups such as Orkes Irama in 1965 and D'lloyd in 1970. The song has been recorded in Malaysia by singers such as Dayang Nurfaizah and Siti Nurhaliza in albums of children's songs.

Lyrics
There are many variations in the lyrics found in Indonesia and Malaysia, a version recorded by singers such as Pete Seeger and Miriam Makeba is as follows:

Some versions popular in Indonesia are variants of the following:

See also 

 Indonesian culture
 Indonesian music
 Chan Mali Chan
 Rasa Sayang

References 

Indonesian music
Indonesian folk songs
Indonesian culture
Indonesian pop songs
Malaysian folk songs
Malaysian children's songs